William Anthony Morales (born September 7, 1972 in Tucson, Arizona) is a retired Major League Baseball catcher who played for the Baltimore Orioles in .

Morales attended the University of Arizona, and in 1991 he played collegiate summer baseball with the Orleans Cardinals of the Cape Cod Baseball League. He was selected by the Oakland Athletics in the 14th round of the 1993 MLB Draft.

References

External links

1972 births
Living people
Baseball players from Arizona
Baltimore Orioles players
Rochester Red Wings players
Orleans Firebirds players
Major League Baseball catchers
Arizona Wildcats baseball players
Tucson High School alumni
American expatriate baseball players in Canada
Colorado Springs Sky Sox players
Edmonton Trappers players
El Paso Diablos players
Huntsville Stars players
Memphis Redbirds players
Midland RockHounds players
Modesto A's players
Southern Oregon A's players
Tucson Sidewinders players
Tulsa Drillers players
Vancouver Canadians players
West Michigan Whitecaps players
Anchorage Bucs players